Beaverton is a city in Washington County, in the U.S. state of Oregon with a small portion bordering Portland in the Tualatin Valley. The city is among the main cities that make up the Portland metropolitan area. Its population was 97,494 at the 2020 census, making it the second-largest city in the county and the seventh-largest city in Oregon. Beaverton is an economic center for Washington County along with neighboring Hillsboro. It is home to the world headquarters of Nike, Inc., although it sits outside of city limits on unincorporated county land.

The hunter–gatherer Atfalati tribe of the Kalapuya people inhabited the Tualatin Valley prior to the arrival of European–American settlers in the 19th century. They occupied a village near the Beaverton and Fanno creeks called Chakeipi, which meant "place of the beaver", and early white settlers referred to this village as Beaverdam. Lawrence Hall took up the first land claim in 1847 and established a grist mill. The entry of a railroad in 1868 spurred growth in the small farming communities and led to the town's incorporation in 1893.

History

Early settlement 

According to Oregon Geographic Names, Beaverton's name is derived from the settlement's proximity to a large body of water resulting from beaver dams.

The area of Tualatin Valley that became Beaverton was originally the home of a Native American tribe known as the Atfalati, which settlers mispronounced as Tualatin. The Atfalati population dwindled in the latter part of the 18th century, and the prosperous tribe was no longer dominant in the area by the 19th century when settlers arrived. The tribe named their village Chakeipi, which translates to "place of the beaver," which early settlers referred to as "Beaverdam."

Early settlers include the Hall Family from Kentucky, the Denneys who lived on their claim near present-day Scholls Ferry Road and Hall Blvd, and Orin S. Allen, from western New York. Lawrence Hall purchased  in Beaverdam in 1847 and built a grist mill with his brother near present-day Walker Road. His was the first land claim in the area. He was soon followed by Thomas Denney in 1848, who came to the area and built its first sawmill. In 1860, a toll plank road from Portland to Beaverton was completed over a trail called Canyon Road.

After the American Civil War, numerous other settlers, including Joshua Welch, George Betts, Charles Angel, W. P. Watson, and John Henry, laid out what is now known as Beaverton hoping they could bring a railroad to an area once described as, "mostly swamps & marshes connected by beaver dams to create what looked like a huge lake." In 1872, Beaverton's first post office opened in a general store operated by Betts, who also served as the first postmaster of the community. Betts Street, where the current post office now stands, is named in honor of him. In 1893, Beaverton, which by that time had a population of 400, was officially incorporated. Alonzo Cady, a local businessman, served as the first mayor. Many major roads in Beaverton are named for these early settlers.

20th century 

Beaverton was an early home to automobile dealerships. A Ford Motor Company dealership was established there in 1915; it was purchased by Guy Carr in 1923 and over the years Carr expanded it into several locations throughout Beaverton. There are still several dealerships near the intersection of Walker and Canyon Roads.

In the early 1920s, Beaverton was home to Premium Picture Productions, a movie studio which produced about fifteen films. The studio site was later converted into Watt's Field and associated aircraft manufacturing facilities. A second Beaverton airport, Bernard's Airport, was later developed farther north, at the present location of the Cedar Hills Crossing mall.

The town's first library opened in 1925. Originally on the second floor of the Cady building, it has been moved repeatedly; in 2000 it was moved to its current location on Hall Boulevard and 5th Street. A branch location was opened for the first time in June 2010, when the Murray-Scholls location opened near the Murrayhill neighborhood. The Beaverton libraries and 15 other local libraries participate in the Washington County Cooperative Library Services.

21st century  

In December 2004, the city and Washington County announced an "interim plan" which would lead to Beaverton becoming the second-largest city in Oregon, second only to Portland. The "interim" plan actually covered a period of more than ten years; from the county's perspective, the plan supported its strategy of having cities and special districts provide urban services. The city of Beaverton also attempted to annex certain businesses, including Nike, which responded with a legal and lobbying effort to resist the annexation. The lobbying effort succeeded quickly, with the Oregon Legislative Assembly enacting Senate Bill 887, which prohibited Beaverton from annexing Nike without the company's consent. The bill also applied to property owned by Electro Scientific Industries, Columbia Sportswear, and Tektronix, and in August 2008 the Oregon Land Use Board of Appeals ruled that the bill also barred the city from annexing property belonging to Leupold & Stevens. (See below, under Economy.) Beaverton's legal efforts to annex Nike cost the city over one million dollars. In 2016, Nike unveiled plans to expand its campus by 3.2 million square feet (approximately 300,000 square meters) at a projected cost of one billion dollars.

The Oregon State Legislature has also passed legislation which redetermined Washington County's urban growth boundary to include more development. In 2018, the Metro Council voted to once again expand the urban growth boundary to include the Cooper Mountain urban reserve area.

In 2016, voters approved a $35 million bond for a new  Public Safety Center built to withstand a major earthquake. The center, which opened in fall of 2020, now  houses the city's Emergency Management and Police Departments. Construction began in September 2018.

The city has tried to encourage transit-oriented development around the city's MAX Light Rail stations. The Round, a mixed-use development around Beaverton Central MAX Station on the site of a former sewer plant, was announced in 1996. In 2014, the City of Beaverton moved its city hall into The Beaverton Building, an office building in The Round. The Round currently consists of 24,000 square foot of retail space with 63 residential condominiums located above. BG's Food Cartel, Beaverton's first food cart pod, opened in 2018 and has 31 food carts, a speakeasy bar, and an event venue. Adjacent to The Round, the 550 seat Patricia Reser Center for the Arts opened in 2022, and was made possible by pledges from the Beaverton Arts Foundation and Pat Reser along with public sources. The groundbreaking was performed on November 13, 2019. In addition to the Reser Center, a new 125-room hotel opened next to The Round in February of 2021. The performing arts center, apartments, city hall, hotel, MAX light rail station, plazas, food carts, and nearby businesses are collectively known as Downtown Beaverton.

Geography
The city is located along the eastern edge of the Tualatin Valley just west of the Tualatin Mountains. It is bordered by Portland to the east, Hillsboro to the west, and Tigard to the south. Much of the remaining area surrounding Beaverton in the north and southwest constitutes unincorporated Washington County land.

Neighborhoods 
The city of Beaverton is divided into 13 neighborhoods: Central Beaverton, Denney Whitford, Raleigh West, Five Oaks, Triple Creek, Greenway, Highland, Neighbors Southwest, Sexton Mountain, South Beaverton, Vose, West Beaverton, and West Slope. Each neighborhood runs a Neighborhood Association Committee (NAC) to discuss neighborhood affairs, with the exception of Five Oaks and Triple Creek, and Denney Whitford and Raleigh West each sharing a NAC.

Climate

Demographics

2020 Census 
As of the census of 2020, there were 97,494 people.
The racial makeup of the city was 59% Non-Hispanic White, 2.9% African American, 1.0% Native American, 12.2% Asian, 0.5% Pacific Islander, 8.7% from other races, and 12.5% from two or more races. Hispanic or Latino of any race were 18.1% of the population.

As of 2020 the median income for a household in the city was $38,261, and the median income for a family was $71,806. Males had a median income of $41,683 versus $31,204 for females. The per capita income for the city was $25,419. About 5.0% of families and 7.8% of the population were below the poverty line, including 8.5% of those under age 18 and 6.8% of those age 65 or over.

2010 census 
As of the census of 2010, there were 89,803 people, 37,213 households, and 21,915 families residing in the city. The racial makeup of the city was 73.0% White, 2.6% African American, 0.6% Native American, 10.5% Asian, 0.5% Pacific Islander, 8.2% from other races, and 4.5% from two or more races. Hispanic or Latino of any race were 16.3% of the population.

There were 37,213 households, of which 31.0% had children under the age of 18 living with them, 43.7% were married couples living together, 10.6% had a female householder with no husband present, 4.6% had a male householder with no wife present, and 41.1% were non-families. 30.9% of all households were made up of individuals, and 8.5% had someone living alone who was 65 years of age or older. The average household size was 2.39 and the average family size was 3.03.

The median age in the city was 34.7 years. 22.9% of residents were under the age of 18; 9.2% were between the ages of 18 and 24; 33% were from 25 to 44; 24.5% were from 45 to 64; and 10.4% were 65 years of age or older. The gender makeup of the city was 48.6% male and 51.4% female.

Economy

Company headquarters
Reser's Fine Foods, processor and distributor of freshly prepared foods, has headquartered in Beaverton since 1960. Leupold & Stevens, maker of rifle scopes and other specialty optics, has been located on property adjacent to the City of Beaverton since 1968. The Beaverton City Council annexed that property in May 2005, and Leupold & Stevens challenged that annexation. The company eventually won the legal fight in 2009 with the city, thus the company was de-annexed from the city. Beaverton is home to the world headquarters of Nike, Inc. Its headquarters are located on an unincorporated area inside, but excluded from, Beaverton city limits. Significant amounts of construction and development have taken place on the Nike Campus throughout the 2010s heading into the 2020s. Columbia Outdoor HQ sits outside of current city limits, Beaverton  did not incorporate the HQ during 2000-2009.

Technology companies
As part of the Silicon Forest, Beaverton is the location of numerous technology organizations and companies, including Linux Technology Center of IBM, Tektronix, ADI formerly known as Maxim Integrated Products, VeriWave, and Oregon Technology Business Center (OTBC), a non-profit tech startup incubator. Phoenix Technologies operates its Northwestern Regional Office in Beaverton.

Largest employers
According to the City's 2021 Comprehensive Annual Financial Report, the largest employers in the city are:

Tourist attractions 
Beaverton Farmer's Market
BG's Food Cartel
Cooper Mountain Nature Park
Cooper Mountain Vineyards
Hyland Forest Park
Patricia Reser Center for the Arts
Red Tail Golf Center
Tualatin Hills Nature Park
Veterans Memorial Park
 Jenkins Estate

Shopping
Cedar Hills Crossing is a shopping mall within the city of Beaverton. Facilities include a variety of restaurants, big-box retailers, a bowling alley, and more.

Government

The current mayor of Beaverton is Lacey Beaty, who was first elected in 2020. The Beaverton City Council consists of six councilors. The Mayor and City Councilors are all elected at large to serve four-year terms in a council-manager form of government where the Beaverton City Council and Mayor hire a city manager who is the administrative head of the city.

Sports

The Howard M. Terpenning Recreation Complex, opened in 1978, features swimming, athletics, tennis, baseball, softball and basketball facilities.

Little League
In 2014, the Beaverton–Aloha Little League Intermediate baseball team won the state tournament and traveled to Nogales, Arizona to play in the regional tournament, where they accumulated a 2–2 record.

In 2006, the Murrayhill Little League baseball team qualified for the 2006 Little League World Series, the first Oregon team in 48 years to go that far. Murrayhill advanced to the semi-finals before losing; the third-place game was rained out and not rescheduled. In addition, a Junior Softball team from Beaverton went to 2006 World Series in Kirkland, Washington, ending in sixth place.

In 2002, Beaverton's Little League Softball team took second place to Waco, Texas, in the Little League Softball World Series.

Curling
In January 2013, Beaverton became the first city in Oregon to have an ice rink dedicated to the sport of curling, the Evergreen Curling Club. In January 2017, the Evergreen Curling Club hosted the United States Curling Association Senior Women's National Championship.

Roofball
The Roofball Federation of America was founded in Beaverton by Adam Willis. The Roofball U.S. Open, RFA Cup, and Roofball World Championships are held in Beaverton. 

Roofball Scoring is as follows:
1 point: (CATCH) Catch the ball when it comes off the roof before it hits the ground
5 points: (PING) Ping the ball off of the large chimney pipe.
10 points: (AROUND) Throw the ball up one side of the roof, have it go past and around the large pipe and then down the other side of the roof.
-5 points: (OVER) Throw the ball over the roof. You also have to walk around the house to get the ball.
-1 points: (CAR) If the ball hits the car before you catch it, you lose one point.
5 points: (CATCH MULTIPLIER) If the ball hits the second smaller pipe and you catch it you get 5 points. Fail to catch it and you are not awarded any points.
15 points: ("15") Throw the ball around the main pipe, have it hit the catch multiplier and you catch it for the most exciting play in roofball.

Education
The public schools of Beaverton are part of the Beaverton School District. There are six public high schools in the district – Aloha High School, Beaverton High School, Mountainside High School, Southridge High School, Sunset High School, and Westview High School. It also has several public option schools serving grades 6-12 like the International School of Beaverton, Arts and Communication Magnet Academy, and Beaverton Academy of Science and Engineering. Merlo Station High School is another alternative learning school within the district. Private schools in the area include 
German American School,
Holy Trinity School,
Jesuit High School,
Saint Cecilia Grade School,
Southwest Christian School,
Valley Catholic School,
and
WoodHaven School.

Colleges and universities
 Portland Community College (PCC)  — Although it is based in Portland, some facilities operate in Beaverton.

Infrastructure
Fire protection is provided through Tualatin Valley Fire and Rescue. EMS services are provided by Metro West Ambulance.

Transportation

Beaverton is served by transit bus, commuter rail, and light rail services operated by the Portland metropolitan area's regional transit agency, TriMet. The MAX Blue Line serves all seven stations while the MAX Red Line serves only Beaverton Transit Center and Sunset Transit Center. Beaverton Transit Center, TriMet's busiest transit center, in addition to MAX, serves as a transit hub for bus routes mostly operating on the west side and as the northern terminus of WES Commuter Rail. , the second station southbound on WES, is also located in Beaverton. Intercity bus services with stops in Beaverton include POINT and TCTD.

Oregon Electric and Red Electric interurban lines once served the city in the early 20th century. In the 1940s, Tualatin Valley Stages, a division of Portland Stages, Inc., provided limited bus transit service between the city and downtown Portland; it operated later as a separate company, Tualatin Valley Buses, Inc., through the 1960s. This was one of four privately owned bus companies that served the Portland metropolitan area and were collectively known as the "Blue Bus" lines. All four companies were replaced in 1970 by TriMet, which expanded bus service to cover more areas of Beaverton.

The city is the location of a major freeway interchange for U.S. Route 26 (US 26; Sunset Highway) and Oregon Route 217 (OR 217). The Sunset Highway connects Beaverton to Hillsboro and the Oregon Coast to the west and Portland to the east. OR 217 travels from Beaverton south through Tigard and terminates at an interchange with Interstate 5 (I-5).

Notable people

James Allsup – far-right political commentator
Charles E. Bernard – aviator
John Brotherton – actor
Mike Byrne – drummer for The Smashing Pumpkins
Janet Chvatal – actress
Grace Crunican – general manager for Bay Area Rapid Transit
Ward Cunningham – inventor of the wiki
Brad Fitzpatrick – programmer
Ted Geoghegan – screenwriter
Barrie Gilbert – inventor
Erik Hurtado – professional soccer player
Ian Karmel – stand-up comedian and writer
Gloria Calderon Kellett – writer
Anne Kenney – television producer
Morten Lauridsen – composer
Michael McQuilken – director
Moultrie Patten – jazz musician 
Rubio Rubin – professional soccer player
Ari Shapiro – radio journalist
Royal Skousen – professor
Todd Snider – musician 
Courtney Taylor-Taylor – lead singer of The Dandy Warhols
James B. Thayer – United States Army brigadier general
Tommy Thayer – lead guitarist for Kiss

Sister cities
Beaverton's sister cities are:
 Gotemba, Japan (1987)
 Hsinchu, Taiwan (1988)
 Cheonan, South Korea (1989)
 Birobidzhan, Russia (1990)
 Trossingen, Germany (1993)
 Cluses, France (1999)

References

External links
 

 
1868 establishments in Oregon
Cities in Oregon
Cities in Washington County, Oregon
Populated places established in 1868
Portland metropolitan area